The Deadly Hands of Kung Fu was an American black-and-white martial arts comics magazine published by Magazine Management, a corporate sibling of Marvel Comics. A total of 33 issues were published from 1974 to 1977, plus one special edition. Additionally, a color Marvel comic titled simply Deadly Hands of Kung Fu was published as a 2014 miniseries.

Publishing history
The Deadly Hands of Kung Fu was published in the mid-to-late 1970s by Magazine Management, a corporate sibling of Marvel Comics, amid the martial arts movie fad of the time. Launched in 1974 as part of Magazine Management's line of black-and-white comics magazines, it ran 33 issues through 1977. Recurring characters included:
 The Sons of the Tiger – Three men and one woman linked by mystical amulets
 The White Tiger – Heir to the amulets of the Sons of the Tiger
 Shang Chi, Master of Kung Fu (from Marvel Comics), incorporating characters and concepts licensed from the Sax Rohmer estate
 Iron Fist the Living Weapon (from Marvel Comics)
 The Daughters of the Dragon – Colleen Wing and Misty Knight (characters derived from Marvel Comics' Iron Fist series)

Each issue had comics stories featuring these characters, both single-issue stories and multi-issue story arcs. Most issues also included a review of a recent martial arts film. Other issues had interviews with martial arts instructors, while others had interviews with movie or television celebrities related to martial arts.

Early issues had a martial arts instructional section which described some elementary fighting techniques. These were provided by comics illustrator/martial artist Frank McLaughlin. The magazine was in black-and-white except for the cover. The cost of the magazine was 75 cents for issues #1–14. Issue #15 was a Super Annual (all reprints) issue and cost $1.25. Issues #16–33 were $1.00, as well as the 1974 Kung Fu Special (summer 1974); cover-titled Special Album Edition: The Deadly Hands of Kung Fu. Issue #28 (Sept. 1976) was an all-Bruce Lee special, including a 35-page comic book format biography written by Martin Sands, and drawn by Joe Staton and Tony DeZuniga.

Some stories were set in feudal Japan and starring samurai-type characters, including a four-part story arc called "Sword Quest", illustrated by Sanho Kim and Tony DeZuniga. The Sons of the Tiger/White Tiger feature ran until the penultimate issue.<

The Sons of the Tiger

The Sons of the Tiger are fictional characters, three martial arts heroes appearing in American comic books published by Marvel Comics. They were created by Gerry Conway and drawn by Dick Giordano and first appeared in The Deadly Hands of Kung Fu #1 (April 1974).

The Sons of the Tiger were three friends and martial arts students of Master Kee: Lin Sun, of Chinese ancestry, was the leader of the trio and adopted son of Master Kee; Abe Brown was an African American from the streets of Harlem; and Robert Diamond was a Caucasian Hollywood actor.

Publication history

The Sons of the Tiger first appeared in comics published by Curtis Magazines (a short lived imprint of Marvel Comics) called The Deadly Hands of Kung Fu. The series was created by Gerry Conway and drawn by Dick Giordano, and was published in the early 1970s amidst the kung fu or chopsocky movie craze.

The Sons of the Tiger made appearances in Special Collector's Edition: Savage Fists of Kung Fu #1. They also appeared in the Special Album Edition of The Deadly Hands of Kung Fu. Both of these appearances contained the same story, titled "The Master Plan of Fu Manchu". In this story, the Sons of the Tiger team up with Shang-Chi and Iron Fist. The Special Collector's Edition contained the story in color, while the Special Album Edition was in black-and-white.

Fictional history
Origin
Lin Sun is returning from a martial arts tournament with his first place trophy when he is suddenly attacked by ninjas in front of his school in San Francisco. After defeating the villains, he goes into the "Tiger Dojo", which has been ransacked. He finds a dying Master Kee, who tells him that there are forces in this world which would destroy us and then points to a box on a shelf, after which he dies. In the box, Lin finds three amulets made of jade, a tiger's head and two claws: the symbol of the school. The inscription at the base of the box reads, "When three are called and stand as one, as one they'll fight, their will be done...For each is born anew, The Tiger's Son." They are later known as "the Amulets of Power".

Soon after, Lin meets up with his two friends, Abe Brown and Bob Diamond, who have also been attacked by ninjas. Lin recounts the story of Master Kee's death and gives each of them one of the jade tiger claw amulets. They soon discover that when they join hands and chant the inscription from the box they become mystically connected. Their martial arts skills combine to become one force and their physical abilities are tripled when they wear the amulets.

During the series' run, the trio runs up against "the Silent Ones", an evil organization with mystical ties attempting to gain world domination.

Beginning in Deadly Hands of Kung Fu #19, entitled "An Ending", the trio breaks up and Lin Sun throws all three amulets in a trash can located in an alley. There, Hector Ayala finds the amulets and wears them to become the White Tiger. The Sons of the Tiger appeared in the next two stories, "A Beginning" and "To Claw the Eyes of Night", during the transition to the White Tiger stories. The character of Abe Brown is mostly seen periodically after that. The book continued using the title "The Sons of the Tiger", even though the trio had split up and power was transferred to the White Tiger.

Bob Diamond continued to make occasional appearances in Power Man and Iron Fist as Colleen Wing's lover.

The Sons of the Tiger appeared briefly with Luke Cage's Human Resistance after the Scarlet Witch altered the world during the House of M crossover, along with the Daughters of the Dragon, the Black Cat, Iron Fist and the Moon Knight. Lin Sun, Abe Brown and Lotus Shinchuko appeared in an issue of The Pulse as bodyguards for Luke Cage, who had been injured during the events of Secret War. They also appeared alongside Spider-Man and the Human Torch in Marvel Team-Up #40 (Dec 1975). In November 2008, they made an appearance in Manifest Destiny: Wolverine. The Sons of the Tiger reunited in the 2014 Deadly Hands of Kung-Fu miniseries, where they aided Shang-Chi and his comrades.

Membership
Lin Sun
Lin Sun is the Chinese leader of the Sons of the Tiger and the adoptive son of Master Kee.

The Black Tiger
The Black Tiger (Abraham "Abe" Brown) is the brother of Hobie Brown / Prowler. Abe took up martial arts and befriended fellow martial artists Lin Sun and Bob Diamond. Together, they found three jade tiger amulets and became the Sons of the Tiger. The Sons of the Tiger would team up with other heroes, first with Shang-Chi and Iron Fist and then with Spider-Man and the Human Torch. Abe and the Sons of the Tiger broke up when Lin and Bob started fighting over a woman, throwing their amulets away in the process. Abe later took a vacation and his suitcase was switched by a mysterious woman named Brillalae. The suitcase contained the Black Tiger costume and Abe's plane was hijacked by men who were looking for it. The plane crashed, but Abe managed to survive. Abe chased one of the hijackers, named Mole, and both ended up getting captured by Bedouins, who forced them to fight for the title of the Black Dragon. Abe defeated Mole and won the costume, becoming the Black Tiger. Abe was last seen having helped form the Penance Corps.

Bob Diamond
Bob Diamond is a Caucasian Hollywood actor.

Other versions
Marvel Zombies Return
In the Marvel Zombies Return reality, the Sons of the Tiger were partaking in a karate tournament until a Zombie Wolverine crashed it and killed some of the participants.

MC2
In the MC2 reality, the Sons of the Tiger received an invitation from Deadpool to attend a martial arts tournament to see if they still can perform their martial arts skills.

In other media
 Abraham Brown appears in the Spider-Man animated series, voiced by Ogie Banks. This version is a technology expert and maintains his brother Hobie Brown's equipment. In the episode "Bring on the Bad Guys" Pt. 3, a botched robbery has Abraham taken captive as Silvermane forces the Prowler to take on Spider-Man's bounty with failure. Unsuccessful in the encounter, the two formed a reluctant alliance to save Abraham from Silvermane. While Abraham runs off to call the police, Spider-Man and the Prowler fight Silvermane. After Silvermane's defeat, the Prowler thanks Spider-Man, giving a battery essential to the latter's science project in the process. As Spider-Man swings off, Abraham gets confused about Spider-Man being in a science fair.
 Abe Brown appears in Spider-Man: Homecoming (2017), portrayed by Abraham Attah. This version is a classmate of Peter Parker's and part of the decathlon team. He comically speaks his mind about everything, especially when fellow decathlon team member Flash Thompson answers a question incorrectly.
 Abe Brown is listed as the "director" of the alternate reality 1950s-style sitcom Wanda Maximoff and Vision "star" in for "Episode 1" of the Disney+ television miniseries WandaVision.

Editors
Source:
 Roy Thomas: #1, 2
 Tony Isabella: #3–6 and Special Album Edition
 David Anthony Kraft: #9, 10 (co-edited with Don McGregor)
 Don McGregor: #7, 8, 10 (co-edited with David Anthony Kraft), 11, 16, 17
 Archie Goodwin: #12–15, 18–25
 John Warner: #26–33

The Deadliest Heroes of Kung Fu
Magazine Management also published one issue of an offshoot magazine, The Deadliest Heroes of Kung Fu, in 1975. It contained no comics elements, but featured a lengthy article reprinted from Deadly Hands as well as instructional features by Frank McLaughlin. Editor John Warner explained that The Deadliest Heroes of Kung Fu was a trial balloon for an all-articles companion to Deadly Hands.

Collected editions 
 The Deadly Hands of Kung Fu Omnibus Vol. 1 collects The Deadly Hands of Kung Fu #1-18, The Deadly Hands of Kung Fu Special Album Edition, and The Deadliest Heroes of Kung Fu, 1,152 pages, November 15, 2016, 
 The Deadly Hands of Kung Fu Omnibus Vol. 2 collects The Deadly Hands of Kung Fu #19-33 and material from Bizarre Adventures #25, 1,000 pages, June 20, 2017,

References

1974 comics debuts
Action-adventure comics
Comics magazines published in the United States
Monthly magazines published in the United States
Comics by Don McGregor
Comics by George Pérez
Comics by Gerry Conway
Comics by Steve Englehart
Defunct American comics
Defunct magazines published in the United States
Magazines established in 1974
Magazines disestablished in 1977
Marvel Comics titles
Martial arts magazines
Shang-Chi titles
Martial arts comics